"ClosetCon '13" is the eighth episode of the fifth season of the American sitcom Modern Family, and the series' 104th overall. It was aired on November 20, 2013. The episode was written by Ben Karlin and directed by Fred Savage.

Plot
Jay (Ed O'Neill) and Claire (Julie Bowen) are out of town because they have to attend the annual Closet Convention. While Claire seems very interested at the schedule of the convention and wants to participate in all the activities, Jay is more interested in meeting old friends, including Rita (Randee Heller), and do the pranks they used to do. Jay wants to put a skeleton in Claire's closet to scare her but because of his awkward behavior in front of her every time Rita is around, Claire believes that her dad has an affair. Claire tries to make Jay tell her the truth but they both end up making confessions like that Jay tried to get Phil (Ty Burrell) a job in another state so he will break up Claire and Claire called the immigration to inform them about Gloria (Sofía Vergara).

Phil and Gloria are back home alone with the kids and they plan to go all together to a restaurant. Before they leave, Phil discovers what Jay is hiding in his secret closet; a treasure of antique model toys. He gets so excited with his discovery that he unintentionally breaks one of them, a replica of Apollo 13. They immediately cancel their reservation at the restaurant and they all try to fix the model with Phil's dad, Frank's (Fred Willard), help via Skype. In the meantime, Alex (Ariel Winter) and Haley (Sarah Hyland) fight over the pizza delivery boy that they both like.

Meanwhile, Mitch (Jesse Tyler Ferguson) and Cam (Eric Stonestreet) visit Cam's birthplace, Missouri. Mitch is not very excited being there but after a fight he has with Cam, he decides to give it a try and embrace the farm life. The problem is that Cam's grandmother (Ann Guilbert), who does not know that Cam is gay nor that he has a kid nor that he is getting married, arrives. Cam asks Mitch to pretend they are not a couple and even though Mitch does not agree with the idea, he agrees to do it. Eventually Cam tells his grandmother the truth but she does not take the news very well.

Cultural references 
The scene where Phil tries fix the final part of the model, is a parody scene reference to the film Apollo 13, where it is necessary to provide a way for the three stranded astronauts to build a carbon dioxide filter from only the objects they have on board.

Reception

Ratings
In its original American broadcast, "ClosetCon '13" was watched by 10.19 million; down 0.56 from the previous episode.

Reviews
"ClosetCon '13" received mixed reviews.

Leigh Raines of TV Fanatic rated the episode with 4/5 saying that the episode "was a fun trip to the farm for all".

Jordan Adler of We Got This Covered gave a good review to the episode saying that this may be the best episode of the season so far. "One great comedic set piece and a surprisingly adept dramatic scene close what may be the best episode of Modern Family season five so far. The three plots this week all work very well, becoming more poignant and witty than their initial set-up would suggest, and all of the actors are at the top of their game."

Britt Hayes from Screen Crush gave a mixed review to the episode saying: "Overall, this week is an improvement over last week’s overloaded mess of an episode, if only because we’re back down to the basic three-plot structure, but there are no big, stand-out laughs [...] Here’s an episode of wholesome, family basic cable comedy where families have simple conflicts that are resolved over the course of 30 minutes with commercial breaks. It’s just so basic."

Joshua Alston of The A.V. Club gave a C+ rate to the episode. "Modern Family becomes a high-wire act when it separates its characters into three storylines with no overlap between them. Without a nifty structure to string together the disparate plots, the parts get more scrutiny, because they aren't contributing to a greater whole [...] a shambling episode [ClosetCon '13] with a smattering of funny lines and a sequence that worked far better than it should have, but without a ton of meat on its bones."

References

External links 
 
 "ClosetCon '13" at ABC.com

Modern Family (season 5) episodes
2013 American television episodes
Television episodes set in Missouri